Christmas Extraordinaire is Mannheim Steamroller's sixth Christmas album overall and the group's fourth Christmas studio album. The album was originally released in 2001. The song "O Tannenbaum" features a lead vocal by Johnny Mathis.

Five of the album's tracks were included in the group's 2004 compilation Christmas Celebration.

On June 21, 2004, Christmas Extraordinaire was certified Triple Platinum by the Recording Industry Association of America for shipment of three million copies in the United States.

As of November 2014, Christmas Extraordinaire is the fourteenth best-selling Christmas/holiday album in the U.S. in the Nielsen SoundScan era of music sales tracking (March 1991 – present), having sold 2,920,000 copies according to SoundScan.

Track listing

Personnel
Chip Davis: Recorders, Drums
Jackson Berkey: Harpsichord
Ron Cooley: Guitar, Lute, Bass
Roxanne Layton: Recorder, Crumhorns
Arnie Roth: Violin Solo~The First Noel, Concertmaster
Bobby Jenkins: Oboe Solo
Johnny Mathis: Vocals on "O Tannenbaum"

See also
 List of Billboard Top Holiday Albums number ones of the 2000s

Notes 

2001 Christmas albums
Mannheim Steamroller albums
American Gramaphone albums
American Gramaphone Christmas albums
Christmas albums by American artists
Classical Christmas albums
New-age Christmas albums